The Scarlet Letter is a 2008 opera by Lori Laitman to a libretto by David Mason based on the 1850 novel by Nathaniel Hawthorne. The opera was given a professional premiere in 2016 by Opera Colorado.

Recordings 
Laitman: The Scarlet Letter - Laura Claycomb as Hester Prynne (soprano), Margaret Gawrysiak as Mistress Hibbons (mezzo-soprano), Dominic Armstrong as Arthur Dimmesdale; Kyle Erdos Knapp  as John Wilson (tenors), Malcolm MacKenzie as Roger Chillingworth, and Daniel Belcher  as Governor Bellingham (baritones) Opera Colorado Orchestra and Chorus, Ari Pelto Naxos Records 2017

References

Operas
2016 operas
Operas based on novels
Works based on The Scarlet Letter
Operas set in the United States